Ammon may refer to:

Ancient world
 Ammon, an ancient Canaanite nation.
 The Egyptian god Amun of the same name, also sometimes spelled Ammon
 Horns of Ammon, curling ram horns used as a symbol of the Egyptian deity Ammon (Amun or Amon)
 Zeus Ammon, the Greek interpretation of the Egyptian god Amun

People

Mononym 
 Ammon, bishop of Elearchia ( 4th-5th century)
 Ammon, bishop of Hadrianopolis ( 400AD)
 Ammon (geometer) ( 3rd century), ancient Roman mathematician
 Saint Amun ( 4th century), a Christian saint also known as Ammon
 Ammon, son of Lot (Bible)

Book of Mormon
 Ammon (Book of Mormon explorer), descendant of Zarahemla in the Book of Mormon
 Ammon (Book of Mormon missionary), son of Mosiah II in the Book of Mormon

Given name 
 Ammon Brown (1798-1882), American politician
 Ammon Bundy (born 1975), American militant and activist
 Ammon Hennacy (1893-1970), an American pacifist
 Ammon Matuauto (born 1986), New Zealand rugby player
 Ammon McNeely (born 1970), American rock climber
 Ammon Shea, American writer
 Ammon M. Tenney (1844-1925), American missionary and colonizer
 Ammon Wrigley (1861-1946), English poet

Surname 
Andrea Ammon (born 1958), German physician
Blasius Ammon (1558-1590), Austrian friar and priest
Charles Ammon, 1st Baron Ammon (1873-1960), British politician
Elizabeth Ammon, London-based journalist
Francesca Russello Ammon, American assistant professor
Generosa Ammon (1956-2003), American murder victim
Keith Ammon, American politician
Matt Ammon, American civil servant
Otto Ammon (1842-1916), German anthropologist
Peter Ammon (born 1952), German diplomat and ambassador
Peter H. Ammon, American investor and endowment manager 
Ted Ammon (1949-2001), American businessman

Places
 Ammon, New Brunswick, a community in Canada
 Ammon, Idaho, a city in the US
 Ammon, North Carolina, an unincorporated community in the US
 Ammon, Virginia, an unincorporated community in the US
 Ammon Ford, North Carolina, an unincorporated community in the US

Fictional characters
 Ammon, a character in the 1981 film Clash of the Titans and its 2010 remake
 Ammon Bast, a character from the video game Criminal Case

Other uses
 Ammon's horn, a part of the hippocampus (a major component of the human brain)
Ammon News, Jordanian news agency 
 The Order of Ammon, a secret society of university students

See also

 Ammonia, a colorless gas whose name originates from the Egyptian god Amun. 
 Ammonium, a chemical compound whose name derives from the Egyptian god Amun
 Ammonite, an extinct subclass of mollusks
 Amorites, a Canaanean people often confused with Ammonites
 Amon (disambiguation)
 Amman (disambiguation)

Hebrew-language given names